Jeremy Michael Rafanello (born April 14, 2000) is an American professional soccer player who plays as a forward and winger for the Philadelphia Union of Major League Soccer.

Career

Early career
A native of Delran Township, New Jersey, Rafanello attended Delran High School while participating in the U.S. Soccer Development Academy, after playing a single year of high school soccer.

Rafanello appeared as an amateur player for United Soccer League side Bethlehem Steel FC during their 2018 season via the Philadelphia Union academy.

Rafanello committed to playing college soccer for the Penn State Nittany Lions men's soccer from 2018 onward. In his one year with Penn State he appeared in 18 matches scoring three goals.

FC Helsingør
After a trial at Danish club FC Helsingør it was announced on 11 July 2019, that Rafanello had signed a 2-year contract with the Danes.

Indy Eleven
On 19 February 2020, Rafanello returned to the United States, signing with USL Championship club Indy Eleven. On 9 September 2020, Rafanello scored his first goal as a professional in a 2-1 victory over Sporting Kansas City II.

New York Red Bulls II
On 3 March 2021 it was announced that Rafanello had signed with New York Red Bulls II. He made his debut for the club on 30 April 2021, starting in a 3–2 loss to Hartford Athletic. On 16 June 2021, Rafanello scored his first two goals for New York and also recorded an assist in a 3-1 victory over Charlotte Independence.

Philadelphia Union
Rafanello signed a Homegrown Player contract with the Philadelphia Union on August 23, 2022.

International career
Rafanello made his international debut in 2018 for the USA Under-19 team at the Slovakia Cup, with substitute appearances against Kazakhstan and the Czech Republic. In his lone start, he scored the game-winning goal in the 3-0 victory over Azerbaijan in the 3rd Place match.

References

External links 
 
 

2000 births
Living people
American soccer players
Philadelphia Union II players
Penn State Nittany Lions men's soccer players
Association football forwards
Soccer players from New Jersey
USL Championship players
Delran High School alumni
People from Delran Township, New Jersey
Sportspeople from Burlington County, New Jersey
USL League Two players
Reading United A.C. players
FC Helsingør players
Indy Eleven players
New York Red Bulls II players
Philadelphia Union players
American expatriate soccer players
American expatriate sportspeople in Denmark
Expatriate men's footballers in Denmark
Homegrown Players (MLS)
MLS Next Pro players